Agrypon is a genus of parasitoid wasps belonging to the family Ichneumonidae.

The genus was described in 1860 by Förster.

The genus has cosmopolitan distribution.

Species:
 Agrypon flaveolatum
 Agrypon flexorium (Thunberg, 1822)
 Agrypon gracilipes
 Agrypon varitarsum

References

Ichneumonidae